Begum Mariam Hashimuddin was a Member of the 3rd National Assembly of Pakistan as a representative of East Pakistan.

Career
Hashimuddin was a Member of the 4th National Assembly of Pakistan.

In Bangladesh, she served as the President of Jatiya Mahila Party.

References

Pakistani MNAs 1962–1965
Pakistani MNAs 1965–1969
Living people
Year of birth missing (living people)
Jatiya Party politicians